An election to Sligo County Council took place on 4 June 1920 as part of that year's Irish local elections. 20 councillors were elected from 5 electoral divisions by PR-STV voting for a five-year term of office.

Sinn Féin won every seat for election, and also won a massive majority of the vote.

Results by party

Results by Electoral Area

Ballymote

Tubbercurry

Dromore

Sligo

References 

1920 Irish local elections
1920